Ooty Bus Stand, also known as Udhagamandalam Central Bus Stand is a bus station located in the town of Ooty. It serves as main bus stand for The Nilgiris district, Tamil Nadu, apart from bus stands in Coonoor, Kotagiri and Gudalur.

Location

It is located near the Udhagamandalam railway station. The land on which the bus stand stands on now was originally occupied by the Ooty lake, which was later reclaimed to build the bus stand.

Services
The bus stand having about 10 platforms serves nearby towns of the district. The major operators from the bus stand are state–run TNSTC (Coimbatore, Kumbakonam, Tirupur, Erode and Salem), SETC (Trichy, Kanyakumari, Thiruvananthapuram and Chennai), Karnataka State Road Transport Corporation (Bengaluru, Mysuru, Mercara and Hassan) and Kerala State Road Transport Corporation (Sulthan Bathery, Kannur and Malappuram). 
To deposit luggage cloak room facility available in bus stand, 10 Rs per bag 8 hrs. 
No private operators were allowed to ply within the district.

Depots
this bus stand also has TNSTC-OOTY Regional office & OOTY-1,OOTY-2 depots of TNSTC

See also
 Charring cross, Ooty
 Adam's fountain
 Glenmorgan, Ooty

References

Buildings and structures in Ooty
Bus stations in Tamil Nadu
Transport in Ooty